The 1917 New South Wales state election involved 90 electoral district returning one member each. If a candidate failed to achieve at least 50% of the vote in an electorate, a run-off election would take place in the following weeks. In this election, 8 electorates proceeded to second round elections.

Election results

Albury 

Alexandria

Allowrie

Annandale 

Armidale

Ashburnham

Ashfield

Balmain

Bathurst 

The sitting member was Ernest Durack who did not contest the election.

Bega

Belmore 

The sitting Labor member for Belmore, Patrick Minahan, lost preselection and unsuccessfully contested Cootamundra against Labor turned Nationalist Premier William Holman.

Bingara 

George McDonald had been elected as a  member in the 1913 election. He resigned from the party and his seat as a protest at the behaviour of the Easter 1916 NSW Labor conference and retained the seat at the by-election as an Independent.

Bondi

Botany

Burrangong 

Burwood

Byron

Camden

Camperdown

Canterbury

Castlereagh 

Cessnock

Clarence

Cobar

Cootamundra 

Patrick Minahan was the sitting member for Belmore however he lost preselection for that seat.

Corowa

Darling Harbour

Darlinghurst

Drummoyne

Dulwich Hill

Durham

Enmore 

Glebe

Gloucester 

Richard Price had been elected as a  member in the 1913 election. He joined the  Party however he was not endorsed by the party for the 1917 election and ran as an independent.

Gordon 

The sitting member was Charles Wade who did not contest the election.

Gough

Goulburn

Granville

Gwydir

Hartley

Hastings and Macleay

Hawkesbury

Hurstville

Kahibah 

King 

Lachlan

Leichhardt

Lismore

Liverpool Plains 

Lyndhurst

Macquarie

Maitland

Marrickville 

Middle Harbour

Monaro

Mosman

Mudgee

Murray 

Murrumbidgee 

Namoi 

Newcastle 

Newtown 

Orange

Paddington

Parramatta

Petersham

Phillip 

Raleigh

Randwick

Redfern 

Rozelle 

Ryde

St George 

St Leonards

Singleton

Sturt

Surry Hills 

Tamworth

Tenterfield

Upper Hunter

Wagga Wagga

Wallsend

Waverley

Wickham 

Willoughby

Willyama

Wollondilly

Wollongong 

Woollahra

Yass

See also 
 Candidates of the 1917 New South Wales state election
 Members of the New South Wales Legislative Assembly, 1917–1920

Notes

References 

1917